Siskiwit Lake may refer to:

Siskiwit Lake (Isle Royale) in Lake Superior
Siskiwit Lake (Wisconsin)